Midnight Blue is a 1963 album by jazz guitarist Kenny Burrell featuring Stanley Turrentine on tenor saxophone, Major Holley on double bass, Bill English on drums and Ray Barretto on conga, and is one of Burrell's best-known works for Blue Note. Jazz Improv magazine lists the album among its top five recommended recordings for Burrell, indicating that "[i]f you need to know 'the Blue Note sound', here it is". In 2005, NPR included the album in its "Basic Jazz Library", describing it as "one of the great jazzy blues records". The album has been re-issued by Blue Note.

The cover artwork of Elvis Costello's 1981 country album Almost Blue pays homage to the artwork of Midnight Blue.

Track listing 
Except where otherwise noted, all songs composed by Kenny Burrell.

 "Chitlins con Carne" – 5:30
 "Mule" (Kenny Burrell, Major Holley Jr.) – 6:56
 "Soul Lament" – 2:43
 "Midnight Blue" – 4:02
 "Wavy Gravy" – 5:47
 "Gee, Baby, Ain't I Good to You" (Andy Razaf, Don Redman) – 4:25
 "Saturday Night Blues" – 6:16
 "Kenny's Sound" – 4:43 (Bonus track on CD reissue)
 "K Twist" – 3:36 (Bonus track on CD reissue)

Personnel

Performance 
 Kenny Burrell – guitar
 Stanley Turrentine – tenor saxophone (except #3, 4, 6, 9)
 Major Holley – bass (except #3)
 Bill English – drums (except #3)
 Ray Barretto – conga (except #3, 6)

Production 
 Eric Bernhardi – graphic design
 Bob Blumenthal – CD reissue liner notes
 Micaela Boland – design
 Michael Cuscuna – producer, reissue producer
 Leonard Feather – original liner notes
 Gordon Jee – creative director
 Alfred Lion – producer
 Reid Miles – cover design, typography
 Rudy Van Gelder – engineer, remastering
 Tom Vasatka – producer
 Francis Wolff – photography, cover photo

References 

Kenny Burrell albums
Albums produced by Alfred Lion
Blue Note Records albums
Albums produced by Michael Cuscuna
1963 albums
Albums with cover art by Reid Miles